The Nalanda college of Pharmacy (NCOP) is a private Pharmacy college located in Nalgonda, India. NCOP is affiliated to the Jawaharlal Nehru Technological University.

History
NCOP was founded in 1991 by Nalanda Educational Society. It offers courses like D.Pharm, B.pharm. and M.pharm.

Activities
The college organizes co-curricular and extra curricular activities.

External links
 http://nalandapharmacy.ac.in/about-the-college.html//

All India Council for Technical Education
Pharmacy schools in India
Universities and colleges in Telangana
Nalgonda district
Educational institutions established in 1991
1991 establishments in Andhra Pradesh